Bo Jones may refer to:
 Boisfeuillet Jones, Jr. (born 1946), American newspaper executive
Bo Jones (Lost Girl), fictional character in Lost Girl TV series
Levon Jones, also known as Bo Jones, American former death row inmate